Il mondo perduto (The lost world) is a DVD release of ten short documentaries films directed by
Vittorio De Seta between 1954 and 1959.

The series was restored by the Bologna Cinematheque in 2008.

Episodes
1954. Vinni lu tempu de li pisci spata (11 minutes)
1955. Isola di fuoco (11 min.)
1955. Sulfarara (10 min.)
1955. Pasqua in Sicilia (11 min.)
1955. Contadini del mare (10 min.)
1955. Parabola d'oro (10 min.)
1958. Pescherecci (11 min.)
1958. Pastori di Orgosolo (11 min.)
1958. Un giorno in Barbagia (14 min.)
1959. I dimenticati (20 min.)

Related media 
The DVD was released with a book:
Roberto Saviano, Goffredo Fofi, Alberto Farassino, Martin Scorsese, Vincenzo Consolo, Gian Luca Farinelli. La fatica delle mani. Scritti su Vittorio De Seta. Real Cinema, Feltrinelli Editore, 2008. pp. 160,

Awards 
1955. The episode Isola di fuoco won as best documentary at the Cannes Film Festival.
1957. David di Donatello "Targa d'argento".

Notes and references

See also
Détour De Seta

External links 
Il mondo perduto. I cortometraggi di Vittorio De Seta. 1954-1959 at the Feltrinelli.
 

Italian documentary films
1950s documentary films
Documentary film series
Films directed by Vittorio De Sica
1950s Italian films